The Society for the Maintenance of the Faith is an Anglo-Catholic organization in the Church of England founded in 1873. As of 2022, it holds 94 advowsons or rights of patronage for church appointments. The group in 1995 supported the idea of life-long appointments as a means of promoting diversity among the clergy.

Presidents
 Lord Eliot (1873-1878)
 Octavius Leefe (1878-1881, 1889-1901)
 Lord Edward Spencer-Churchill (1881-1889, 1901-11)
 The Duke of Newcastle (1911-1928)
 Lord Mamhead (1928-1945)
 Sir Henry Slesser (1946-1948)
 Sir John Best-Shaw (1949-1967)
 Dr. Arthur Peck (1967-1974)
 Dr. Paul Kent (1974-1999)
 Dr. Brian Hanson CBE (1999-2018)
 Dr. Colin Podmore MBE (2019—)

References

Constitutions of the Society for the Maintenance of the Faith and List of Council and Officers (1876)
William Oddie, "Anglo-Catholic parishes are often very close-knit: the Ordinariate will preserve that" (Catholic Herald, November 12, 2010)
Sutton, Teresa (2019) "Advowsons and private patronage". Ecclesiastical Law Journal, 21 (3). pp. 267-288. ISSN 0956-618X

External links
Official website
Charity overview Charity Commission for England and Wales

Church of England societies and organisations
Anglo-Catholicism
Religious organizations established in 1873
Christian religious orders established in the 19th century
1873 establishments in the United Kingdom